In relativistic physics, a velocity-addition formula is an equation that specifies how to combine the velocities of objects in a way that is consistent with the requirement that no object's speed can exceed the speed of light. Such formulas apply to successive Lorentz transformations, so they also relate different frames. Accompanying velocity addition is a kinematic effect known as Thomas precession, whereby successive non-collinear Lorentz boosts become equivalent to the composition of a rotation of the coordinate system and a boost.

Standard applications of velocity-addition formulas include the Doppler shift, Doppler navigation, the aberration of light, and the dragging of light in moving water observed in the 1851 Fizeau experiment.

History 
The speed of light in a fluid is slower than the speed of light in vacuum, and it changes if the fluid is moving along with the light. In 1851, Fizeau measured the speed of light in a fluid moving parallel to the light using an interferometer. Fizeau's results were not in accord with the then-prevalent theories.

The aberration of light, of which the easiest explanation is the relativistic velocity addition formula, together with Fizeau's result, triggered the development of theories like Lorentz aether theory of electromagnetism in 1892. In 1905 Albert Einstein, with the advent of special relativity, derived the standard configuration formula ( in the ) for the addition of relativistic velocities. The issues involving aether were, gradually over the years, settled in favor of special relativity.

Galilean relativity 

It was observed by Galileo that a person on a uniformly moving ship has the impression of being at rest and sees a heavy body falling vertically downward. This observation is now regarded as the first clear statement of the principle of mechanical relativity. Galileo saw that from the point of view of a person standing on the shore, the motion of falling downwards on the ship would be combined with, or added to, the forward motion of the ship. In terms of velocities it can be said that the velocity of the falling body relative to the shore equals the velocity of that body relative to ship plus the velocity of the ship relative to the shore.

In general for three objects A (e.g. Galileo on the shore), B (e.g. ship), C (e.g. falling body on ship) the velocity vector  of C relative to A (velocity of falling object as Galileo sees it) is the sum of the velocity  of C relative to B (velocity of falling object relative to ship) plus the velocity  of B relative to A (ship's velocity away from the shore). The addition here is the vector addition of vector algebra and the resulting velocity is usually represented in the form

The cosmos of Galileo consists of absolute space and time and the addition of velocities corresponds to composition of Galilean transformations. The relativity principle is called Galilean relativity. It is obeyed by Newtonian mechanics.

Special relativity 

According to the theory of special relativity, the frame of the ship has a different clock rate and distance measure, and the notion of simultaneity in the direction of motion is altered, so the addition law for velocities is changed. This change is not noticeable at low velocities but as the velocity increases towards the speed of light it becomes important. The addition law is also called a composition law for velocities. For collinear motions, the speed of the object (e.g. a cannonball fired horizontally out to sea) as measured from the ship would be measured by someone standing on the shore and watching the whole scene through a telescope as

The composition formula can take an algebraically equivalent form, which can be easily derived by using only the principle of constancy of the speed of light,

The cosmos of special relativity consists of Minkowski spacetime and the addition of velocities corresponds to composition of Lorentz transformations. In the special theory of relativity Newtonian mechanics is modified into relativistic mechanics.

Standard configuration 
The formulas for boosts in the standard configuration follow most straightforwardly from taking differentials of the inverse Lorentz boost in standard configuration. If the primed frame is travelling with speed  with Lorentz factor  in the positive  relative to the unprimed frame, then the differentials are

Divide the first three equations by the fourth,

or

which is

If coordinates are chosen so that all velocities lie in a (common)  plane, then velocities may be expressed as

(see polar coordinates) and one finds

The proof as given is highly formal. There are other more involved proofs that may be more enlightening, such as the one below.

General configuration 

then with the usual Cartesian standard basis vectors , set the velocity in the unprimed frame to be

which gives, using the results for the standard configuration,

where  is the dot product. The only difference from the coordinate expressions is that the above expressions refers to vectors, not components.

One obtains

where  is the reciprocal of the Lorentz factor. The ordering of operands in the definition is chosen to coincide with that of the standard configuration from which the formula is derived.

Either the parallel or the perpendicular component for each vector needs to be found, since the other component will be eliminated by substitution of the full vectors.

The parallel component of  can be found by projecting the full vector into the direction of the relative motion

and the perpendicular component of {{math|u′}} can be found by the geometric properties of the cross product (see figure above right),

In each case,  is a unit vector in the direction of relative motion.

Substituting the parallel component into

results in the above equation.

so that

where the last expression is by the standard vector analysis formula . The first expression extends to any number of spatial dimensions, but the cross product is defined in three dimensions only. In particular, they can be three frames, or they could be the laboratory, a decaying particle and one of the decay products of the decaying particle.

 Properties 

The relativistic addition of 3-velocities is non-linear, so in general

for real number , although it is true that

Also, due to the last terms, is in general neither commutative

nor associative

It deserves special mention that if  and  refer to velocities of pairwise parallel frames (primed parallel to unprimed and doubly primed parallel to primed), then, according to Einstein's velocity reciprocity principle, the unprimed frame moves with velocity  relative to the primed frame, and the primed frame moves with velocity  relative to the doubly primed frame hence  is the velocity of the unprimed frame relative to the doubly primed frame, and one  might expect to have  by naive application of the reciprocity principle. This does not hold, though the magnitudes are equal. The unprimed and doubly primed frames are not parallel, but related through a rotation. This is related to the phenomenon of Thomas precession, and is not dealt with further here.

The norms are given by

and

It is clear that the non-commutativity manifests itself as an additional rotation of the coordinate frame when two boosts are involved, since the norm squared is the same for both orders of boosts.

The gamma factors for the combined velocities are computed as

 Notational conventions 
Notations and conventions for the velocity addition vary from author to author. Different symbols may be used for the operation, or for the velocities involved, and the operands may be switched for the same expression, or the symbols may be switched for the same velocity. A completely separate symbol may also be used for the transformed velocity, rather than the prime used here. Since the velocity addition is non-commutative, one cannot switch the operands or symbols without changing the result.

Examples of alternative notation include:

No specific operand
  (using units where c = 1) 
Left-to-right ordering of operands
  
  
Right-to-left ordering of operands
  

 Applications 
Some classical applications of velocity-addition formulas, to the Doppler shift, to the aberration of light, and to the dragging of light in moving water, yielding relativistically valid expressions for these phenomena are detailed below. It is also possible to use the velocity addition formula, assuming conservation of momentum (by appeal to ordinary rotational invariance), the correct form of the -vector part of the momentum four-vector, without resort to electromagnetism, or a priori not known to be valid, relativistic versions of the Lagrangian formalism. This involves experimentalist bouncing off relativistic billiard balls from each other.

 Fizeau experiment 

The speed of light in a medium uniformly moving with speed  in the positive -direction as measured in the lab frame is given directly by the velocity addition formulas. For the forward direction (standard configuration, drop index  on ) one gets,

Collecting the largest contributions explicitly,

Fizeau found the first three terms. The classical result is the first two terms.

 Aberration of light 

Another basic application is to consider the deviation of light, i.e. change of its direction, when transforming to a new reference frame with parallel axes, called aberration of light. In this case, and insertion in the formula for  yields

the trigonometric manipulations essentially being identical in the  case to the manipulations in the  case. Consider the difference,

correct to order . Employ in order to make small angle approximations a trigonometric formula,

where  were used.

Thus the quantity

the classical aberration angle''', is obtained in the limit .

 Relativistic Doppler shift 

Here velocity components will be used as opposed to speed for greater generality, and in order to avoid perhaps seemingly ad hoc introductions of minus signs. Minus signs occurring here will instead serve to illuminate features when speeds less than that of light are considered.

For light waves in vacuum, time dilation together with a simple geometrical observation alone suffices to calculate the Doppler shift in standard configuration (collinear relative velocity of emitter and observer as well of observed light wave).

All velocities in what follows are parallel to the common positive , so subscripts on velocity components are dropped. In the observers frame, introduce the geometrical observation

as the spatial distance, or wavelength, between two pulses (wave crests), where  is the time elapsed between the emission of two pulses. The time elapsed between the passage of two pulses at the same point in space is the time period , and its inverse  is the observed (temporal) frequency. The corresponding quantities in the emitters frame are endowed with primes.

For light waves 
and the observed frequency is

where  is standard time dilation formula.

Suppose instead that the wave is not composed of light waves with speed , but instead, for easy visualization, bullets fired from a relativistic machine gun, with velocity  in the frame of the emitter. Then, in general, the geometrical observation is precisely the same.

One finds

Observe that in the typical case, the  that enters is negative. The formula has general validity though. When , the formula reduces to the formula calculated directly for light waves above,

If the emitter is not firing bullets in empty space, but emitting waves in a medium, then the formula still applies, but now, it may be necessary to first calculate  from the velocity of the emitter relative to the medium.

Returning to the case of a light emitter, in the case the observer and emitter are not collinear, the result has little modification,

where  is the angle between the light emitter and the observer. This does not happen in the classical optical Doppler effect.

 Hyperbolic geometry 

Associated to the relativistic velocity  of an object is a quantity  whose norm is called rapidity. These are related through

where the vector  is thought of as being Cartesian coordinates on a 3-dimensional subspace of the Lie algebra  of the Lorentz group spanned by the boost generators .
, velocity space, via the above relation. The addition law on collinear form coincides with the law of addition of hyperbolic tangents

with

The line element in velocity space  follows from the expression for relativistic relative velocity in any frame,

where the speed of light is set to unity so that  and  agree. The quantity  is the speed of one or the other object relative to the other object as seen in the given frame. The expression is Lorentz invariant, i.e. independent of which frame is the given frame, but the quantity it calculates is not. For instance, if the given frame is the rest frame of object one, then .

The line element is found by putting  or equivalently ,

Now introduce  through

and the line element on rapidity space  becomes

 Relativistic particle collisions 
In scattering experiments the primary objective is to measure the invariant scattering cross section. This enters the formula for scattering of two particle types into a final state  assumed to have two or more particles,

or, in most textbooks,

where
 is spacetime volume. It is an invariant under Lorentz transformations.
 is the total number of reactions resulting in final state  in  spacetime volume . Being a number, it is invariant when the same spacetime volume is considered.
This is invariant.
 is called the incident flux. This is required to be invariant, but isn't in the most general setting.
 is the scattering cross section. It is required to be invariant.
 are the particle densities in the incident beams. These are not invariant as is clear due to length contraction.
 is the relative speed of the two incident beams. This cannot be invariant since  is required to be so.

The objective is to find a correct expression for relativistic relative speed  and an invariant expression for the incident flux.

Non-relativistically, one has for relative speed . If the system in which velocities are measured is the rest frame of particle type , it is required that  Setting the speed of light , the expression for  follows immediately from the formula for the norm (second formula) in the general configuration as

The relative velocity is incorrectly given in most, perhaps all books on particle physics and quantum field theory. This is mostly harmless, since if either one particle type is stationary or the relative motion is collinear, then the right result is obtained from the incorrect formulas. The formula is invariant, but not manifestly so. It can be rewritten in terms of four-velocities as

The correct expression for the flux, published by Christian Møller in 1945, is given by

One notes that for collinear velocities, .

In some cases (statistical physics and dark matter literature),  is referred to as the Møller velocity'', in which case  means relative velocity. The true relative velocity is at any rate . At LHC the crossing angle is small, around 300 rad, but at
the old Intersecting Storage Ring at CERN, it was about 18◦.

See also 
 Hyperbolic law of cosines
 Biquaternion

Remarks

Notes

References 

 (graduate level)
 (introductory level)
 (graduate level)

Historical 

 Wikisource version

External links 

Special relativity
Equations
Velocity
Kinematics